Girl Spirit is a South Korean reality television singing competition that premiered on cable network JTBC on July 19, 2016. The aim of the show is to highlight the talents of the vocalists of twelve lesser-known girl groups that debuted in recent years. It airs every Tuesday at 22:50 (KST).

The contestants are ranked at the end of every episode based on their performances, and their scores will be accumulated over the course of twelve weeks to determine the top four contestants, two from each team. Each week select contestants' songs will be released digitally. The winner will receive a brand new car and the runner-up will get a family vacation to Saipan; both the winner's and the runner-up's final songs will also be released digitally.

Format
Girl Spirit centers around twelve girl group vocalists who have yet to achieve mainstream success. Five "gurus" will judge their performances every week, as well as give them advice. In addition to the gurus, the contestants' performances will also be judged by 100 "listeners" – men and women who are studying music and have dreams of becoming singers themselves – for a total of 105 maximum points. Starting with episode two, the contestants' scores will be accumulated to determine the top 2 from each team, and the other team will also be judging the performances, making the maximum score 111.

There are two separate rounds in every episode. During the first round, each of the gurus, listeners, and opposite team members will have a device which they will use to cast their vote for the contestants whose performances they liked. After the last contestant performs, round two begins and the listeners must vote for the contestant they felt gave the best performance. The weekly rank is determined by the second round of votes. The contestant who comes in first place then chooses the order in which the members of that team will perform on their next episode.

The contestants are given a different theme for every performance. As an "unstated rule," contestants may perform a "pop song" (English language song), as well as have a "wild card" (featured artist) in a performance only once throughout the competition.

Gurus

 Tak Jae-hoon
 Jang Woo-hyuk (H.O.T.)
 Chun Myung-hoon (NRG)
 Lee Ji-hye (S#arp)
 Seo In-young (Jewelry)

Contestants

Team A

Team B

Episodes

Episode 1: Preliminaries
The twelve contestants were introduced in order of debut, starting with Bo-hyung, who debuted with Spica in January 2012, and ending with Sung-yeon, who debuted with Pledis Girlz in June 2016. Each contestant performed a song with their group followed by a solo song.
Voters: 105

Hyun Seung-hee
Bo-hyung

Episodes 2 and 3: Fight Song
Theme: Songs that inspired the competitors to pursue their dream of becoming singers or helped them during difficult times
Voters: 111

Team A:
Min-jae
Kei
Hyun Seung-hee

Team B:
Uji
Bo-hyung
So-jung (tie)So-yeon (tie)

Episodes 4 and 5: Popular Songs
Theme: Songs that were popular in the first half of the year
Voters: 111

Team A:
Hyun Seung-hee
Kei
Da-won

Team B:
So-jung
Bo-hyung (tie)Uji (tie)

Episode 6: Military Special
Theme: Capturing the hearts of military menThe contestants were paired up to perform for 400 soldiers. The duos consisted of one member from each team, with the possibility of having up to two other members of both groups join them.
Voters: 405

So-jung & Hyun Seung-hee
Uji & Kei
Bo-hyung & Oh Seung-hee

Episodes 7 and 8: Legendary Songs
Theme: Collaborating with legendary singersThe gurus did not vote as they all collaborated with one of the contestants.
Voters: 106

Team A:
Kei
Hyun Seung-hee
Sung-yeon

Team B:
Bo-hyung
So-jung (tie)So-yeon (tie)

Episode 9 and 10: Thank You Song - Enter The Top 4
Theme: 
Voters: 200

Team A:
 Kei (Lovelyz)
 Da-won (Cosmic Girls)
 Hyun Seung-hee (Oh My Girl)

Team B:
 Bohyung (Spica)
 Uji (BESTie)
 Soyeon (Laboum)

Episode 11 : Final - Top 5 

 Bohyung (Spica)
 Hyun Seung-hee (Oh My Girl)

† The combined points totals for Rounds 1 and 2 of the final episode were revealed for only the top two finishers; the winner received 173 points and the runner-up received 160, meaning the algebraic upper limit for the other three finalists is ≤159 points.

Music

"Idol Vocal League - Girl Spirit Episode 02"
"Shout to Myself" (Min-jae) – 3:16
"Atlantis Princess" (Kei) – 4:04
"Don't Be Shy" (So-jung) – 2:13

"Idol Vocal League - Girl Spirit Episode 03"
"I Have Nothing" (Uji) – 4:09
"The Unwritten Legend" (Bo-hyung) – 3:30
"Lady Camellia" (So-yeon) – 3:42

"Idol Vocal League - Girl Spirit Episode 04"
"Cheer Up" (Hyun Seung-hee) – 4:22
"You're the Best" (Da-won ft. Yeon-jung) – 3:48

"Idol Vocal League - Girl Spirit Episode 05"
"I Don't Love You" (So-jung) – 4:40
"Across the Universe" (Bo-hyung ft. Flowsik) – 4:14
"Woo Ah" (Jin-sol) – 3:24

"Idol Vocal League - Girl Spirit Episode 06"
"24 Hours + NoNoNo" (So-jung and Hyun Seung-hee) – 4:47
"Twinkle + Something" (Uji and Kei) – 4:14
"Mom" (Bo-hyung and Oh Seung-hee) – 3:52

"Idol Vocal League - Girl Spirit Episode 07"
"Kiss" (Tak Jae-hoon and Kei) – 4:52
"Maybe I Love You + Lover" (Chae Ri-na and Hyun Seung-hee) – 5:44
"100 Days Prayer" (Lee Ji-hye and Sung-yeon) – 3:55

"Idol Vocal League - Girl Spirit Episode 08"
"A Midsummer Night's Dream" (So-yeon and JeA) – 3:47
"Goodbye Romance" (Hye-mi and Seo In-young) – 3:09

"Idol Vocal League - Girl Spirit Episode 09"
"As You Live" (Kei) – 5:48
"Desperado" (Sung-yeon) – 3:55
"Mt. Chilgap" (Min-jae) – 3:47

"Idol Vocal League - Girl Spirit Episode 10"
"Friend" (Bo-hyung) – 4:32
"Road" (Uji) – 4:24
"A Moment Like This" (So-yeon ft. The Ray) – 3:55

"Idol Vocal League - Girl Spirit Episode 11"
"Caution" (Bo-hyung) – 4:02
"Who You Are" (Bo-hyung) – 4:26
"One's Way Back" (So-jung) – 4:52
"Deviation" (Kei) – 4:31
"U-Go-Girl" (Uji) – 3:40

Ratings
In the table below, the blue numbers represent the lowest ratings and the red numbers represent the highest ratings.

Notes

References

External links
 

2016 South Korean television series debuts
Korean-language television shows
South Korean variety television shows
South Korean music television shows
JTBC original programming